Elena and Her Men is a 1956 film directed by Jean Renoir and starring Ingrid Bergman and Jean Marais. The film's original French title was Elena et les Hommes, and in English-speaking countries, the title was Paris Does Strange Things. It is the third addition to the trilogy, preceded by The Golden Coach (1953) and French Cancan (1955). A restored copy has been released in the 21st century.

It was shot at the Billancourt Studios in Paris. Location shooting took place around the city including in Saint-Cloud and the Castle of Ermenonville. The film's sets were designed by the art director Jean André.

Plot
Produced in 1956, and set in 1890 France, Elena and Her Men tells the story of a young, beautiful, and free-spirited Polish princess in fin de siècle Paris who specializes in granting people good luck. Elena's family has run out of money, and in order to save them, she agrees to marry a wealthy, older family friend. No sooner has she agreed to this engagement, than she meets a handsome stranger during a 14 July celebration, who turns out to be the famous General Rollan's aide, Count de Chevincourt (Mel Ferrer). Sparks fly with the Count, but when he introduces Elena to General Rollan (Jean Marais), the General is quite taken with her as well. By the end of the day, Elena finds her hands full with her engagement and the romantic interests of two new men. To further complicate matters, General Rollan's political advisers see the General's romantic interest in Elena as a way to influence him to take over the French government, and they employ her to grant him the luck he needs to do so.

As the movie progresses, a comical battle of juggling responsibilities develops in each character. Elena feels it is her moral duty to honor her engagement, and to help the General save France, but in her heart she loves the Count. The Count is loyal to his general and country, but is unwilling to concede Elena to the General. The General is in love with Elena but already has a  mistress and is preoccupied with his growing political role in France.

When the General is deliberately posted to a remote town by the French government to prevent a coup d'état, Elena follows, trying to help save France. The Count pursues her, trying to win Elena's heart. The film concludes with Elena and the Count kissing in a brothel window, impersonating Elena and the General, providing a decoy so that the General and his mistress are able to escape France disguised as gypsies. The General abandons his political obligations and Elena, and the show of affection between Elena and the fake General sparks their love for each other touching the hearts of the people watching, and causing a wave of true love to pass over the town and mend political tension.

Cast

 Ingrid Bergman as Princess Elena Sokorowska
 Jean Marais as Général François Rollan
 Mel Ferrer as Le Comte Henri de Chevincourt
 Jean Richard as Hector
 Juliette Gréco as Miarka, a gypsy singer
 Pierre Bertin as Martin-Michaud
 Dora Doll as Rosa la Rose, madame of the brothel
 Frédéric Duvallès as Gaudin
 Renaud Mary as Fleury
 Jacques Morel as Duchene

 Albert Rémy as Buchez
 Jean Claudio as Lionel Villaret
 Mirko Ellis as Marbeau
 Jacques Hilling as Lisbonne
 Jacques Jouanneau as Eugène Martin-Michaud
 Elina Labourdette as Paulette Escoffier
 Olga Valéry as Olga
 Jean Castanier as Isnard
 Magali Noël as Lolotte, Elena’s maid
 Grègory Chmara as Elena's maid

 Jim Gérald as the waiter serving coffee 
 Gaston Modot as Bohemiens chief
 Francine Bergé as a maid
 Paul Préboist as The groom

Background
This was Bergman's first film after leaving her husband, director Roberto Rossellini.  The character of General Rollan was based on the historic General Boulanger. In 1886, Boulanger had much popular support personally despite the French defeat in the Franco-Prussian War, and some supporters urged him to conduct a coup d'état. (He did not.)

Reception
Ingrid Bergman's performance was highly praised. Roger Ebert wrote that she played a Polish princess who could affect the future of France, but he said, that's only what the plot is about:
"The movie is about something else - about Bergman's rare eroticism, and the way her face seems to have an inner light on film. Was there ever a more sensuous actress in the movies? François Truffaut, reviewing this film, observed that 'sex is the only focus of attention'."He says that "Renoir preserves a strong erotic and romantic thread (the love between Bergman and Ferrer) all the way through the movie's farcical elements."

Christopher Faulkner described the film as a farce dealing with many issues and incidents similar to Renoir's well-known Rules of the Game. But he wrote that it is somewhat "cynical," despite its lightness. He says that "the point is made that a woman can only find (provisional) power within representation, on a stage, playing a part. At the end of the film, as coup d’état dissolves into coup de théâtre, the suggestion is that all effective power is actually a function of performance."

References

External links
 
 

1956 films
1950s romantic comedy-drama films
1950s French-language films
French romantic comedy-drama films
Films directed by Jean Renoir
Films set in the 1880s
1956 comedy films
1956 drama films
1950s historical films
Fictional couples
French historical comedy-drama films
Italian historical comedy-drama films
Italian romantic comedy-drama films
Films shot at Billancourt Studios
Films shot in Paris
Films set in Paris
Films scored by Joseph Kosma
1950s Italian films
1950s French films